This is a list of terrorist incidents in Pakistan in 2015.

January 

9 January – Time bomb in drainpipe explosion killed at least eight people took place near Imambargah Aun Muhammad Rizvi in Rawalpindi s Chatian Hattian area

13 January – Insurgents shoot and killed at least 7 security forces and 2 others were wounded in Loralai District, Balochistan.

14 January — At least 2 security personnel killed and another 3 were wounded after a vehicle hit a landmine in Kurram Agency, Federally Administered Tribal Areas.

16 January — At least 1 person killed and 8 were wounded in a remote control blast in chani goth area of bahawalpur Bahawalpur District, Punjab.

30 January — At least 53 people have been killed in a bomb blast at a Shia mosque in southern Pakistan.

February 
1 February – : A landmine explosion killed a captain and injured two personnel of FC Balochistan on Sunday evening in Balochistan's Naseerabad district.

13 February – At least 19 dead as Taliban militants storm Pak Shiite mosque in Peshawar.

17 February – At least 8 people were killed in a blast near Police Lines in Qila Gujar Singh area of Lahore on Tuesday and 19 others injured.

18 February – 3 people were killed and several injured in an explosion at Qasar-e-Sakina Imambargah on Kurri Road, Rawalpindi located at Islamabad Expressway.

24 February — Bomb killed at least one and another 8 were injured in Chaman district, Balochistan.

March 

15 March – Suicide Bombers belonging to the terror outfit Tehrik-i-Taliban Pakistan targeted two churches in the Christian neighborhood of Youhana Abad, Lahore as worshippers were gathering for Sunday mass. At least fourteen people were killed in the blasts and another 70 were reported injured.

20 March – At least 2 people have been killed and 7 wounded after a bomb planted on a motorcycle exploded outside a mosque in Pakistan's largest city Karachi, police have said.

27 March – Lt Col FC Alamdar Hussain, killed in an ambush at Sibi Tali Gang Road Balochistan during Survey of Area.

April 
11 April – Militants gun down 20 laborers and injure 3 others in Turbat's Gogdan area in Balochistan.

24 April – Social activist, Sabeen Mahmud is murdered in Karachi after hosting a session on the disappeared people of Balochistan at T2F (The Second Floor), the cafe and discussion space she founded.

May 
4 May – Lt Col Ahsan(5AK) 82 Wing Commander & 3 troops injured in two different ambushes on Turbat-Buleda Mand road Balochistan.

25 May- In the village of Sambrial (Majra khurd) 8 people were killed at the cricket final...some were injured. They were 12 people with black mask and started firings during the match final. People's still considering that's they were Taliban's.

13 May — 46 people were killed when eight gunmen attacked a bus a Karachi. Most of the victims belonged to the Ismaili, Shia minority.

29 May — 35 people are forced off a bus and kidnapped by members of the United Baluch Army. 23 of those passengers were killed.

August 

16 August — 14 people, including the Punjab home minister Shuja Khanzada died in the suicide blast in Shadi Khan village.

September 
13 September — At least 10 people died when an explosion occurred near a packed rickshaw stand in Multan.

18 September — At least 29 people, including an army captain, were killed as militants attacked a Pakistan Air Force base in Badhaber area on the outskirts of Peshawar.

October 
 14 October - 09 people were killed in blast in Taunsa sharif District Dera ghazi Khan Punjab.
 19 October — At least 11 people were killed and another 22 were wounded after a bomb exploded in a bus in Quetta, Balochistan.
 23 October - 2015 Jacobabad bombing

December  
13 December — A bombing occurred at a clothes bazaar in Pakistan's Parachinar area in the Kurram Valley. It was not clear whether the bombing was a suicide attack or a remotely controlled detonation. The blast killed 23 people and another 30 were injured.

23 Dec – Lt Col Haroon Mazhar wing commander 125 Makran scout got injured during action near Dasht Baluchistan.

29 December — At least 26 killed, 56 injured in suicide blast at NADRA office in Mardan.

See also
 2015 in Pakistan
 Terrorism in Pakistan
 List of terrorist incidents, 2015

References

 
2015 in Pakistan
2015